Marvel Apes is a four-issue limited series by comics publisher Marvel Comics which started publication in October 2008. The series is written by Karl Kesel with art by Ramon Bachs and covers by John Watson.

The Marvel Apes reality is designated as Earth-8101, of which the series' incarnation of Spider-Man, the Spider-Monkey, will make his cinematic debut in the 2023 feature film Spider-Man: Across the Spider-Verse, depicted as a member of Miguel O'Hara's Spider-Forces.

Premise
Marvel Apes was first suggested as a successor to Marvel Zombies by artist and fan Mark Walsh during a convention Q&A session with Joe Quesada.  As with Marvel Zombies before it, Marvel Apes takes place in an alternate universe, in this case a simian-dominated counterpart to Earth-616 that hosts anthropoid versions of popular Marvel superheroes and villains.

As with the introduction of Marvel Zombies in the pages of Ultimate Fantastic Four, the Marvel Apes universe is  visited by an existing Marvel character, in this case Martin Blank a.k.a. Gibbon.  He is accompanied by a female scientist named Fiona Fitzhugh in what has been described by Kesel as a "The Lord of the Rings-style sprawling epic".

Plot

Martin Blank, the Gibbon, having been restored to his simian appearance, is left with his personal life in shambles. His attempts to side with the heroes are frustrated by his ineptitude and even Princess Python, previously a caring and deeply devoted wife, is now fed up with the meek loser that Gibbon has become. Out of boredom and depression, he replies to an ad posted in the Daily Bugle by Fiona Fitzhugh, a spunky and cheery young scientist hoping to study the nature of super-powered individuals. Upon hearing that Gibbon had his powers since birth (as opposed to the majority of mutants who gain their mutation during puberty), Fiona analyzes his aura and hypothesizes that Gibbon may come from another reality in the Multiverse. While attempting to contact such a reality, Fiona and the Gibbon are sucked into a portal that takes them to a world populated by intelligent simians.  Gibbon manages to help Spider-Monkey and the Ape-Vengers, simian versions of the Avengers, subdue Doctor Ooktavius, and he is inducted into the Ape-Vengers.  Fiona is sent to ask for Reed Richards' help in returning to Earth-616; she discovers that in the Marvel Apes reality the cosmic storm that gave the Fantastic Four their powers also gave a human appearance to Susan Storm.

Gibbon is at first excited to become a member of the Ape-Vengers, but after witnessing the brutal lynching of Doctor Ooktapus, he questions the Ape-Vengers methods.  Meanwhile, Fiona and the ape Mr. Fantastic are able to recreate a gateway back to Earth-616.  Captain Ape-merica then reveals that he is actually the simian counterpart of the vampire Baron Blood, who in this reality was able, by sampling Captain America's blood in the forties, to take over his appearance and powers.  The super-soldier serum also removed Baron Blood's vulnerability to sunlight.  After turning the Invaders into vampires as well, Blood became the leader of the Ape-Vengers and uses their bloody lynching of supervillains as a way to feed.

Gibbon, with the help of a cadre of dissident heroes, finds the real Captain America, still frozen in ice, and thaws him to lead the last free heroes against their vampiric foe.  Baron Blood and the vampiric Invaders are destroyed, but in the melee, the portal is destroyed after Fiona and the ape version of Speedball are sent through.  The Gibbon is happy to remain behind in the ape-centric world.

Characters

Heroes
 Ape-X — a small monkey that becomes a large gorilla upon donning a magic Mexican wrestling mask
 Ape-Vengers — this reality's version of the Avengers
 Captain America — a gorilla version of Captain America; actually Baron Blood in disguise. Gibbon managed to free the real Captain America who helps to fight Baron Blood.
 Boomerangutan — an orangutan version of Boomerang
 Gro-Rilla — a gorilla version of Hank Pym
 Hawkape — a primate version of Hawkeye
 Iron Mandrill — a mandrill version of Iron Man
 Juggermonk — a monkey version of Juggernaut
 Monkey-C
 Ms. Marvape — an ape version of Ms. Marvel
 Magneto — a primate version of Magneto
 Quicksilver — a monkey version of Quicksilver
 Sandmonk — a monkey version of Sandman
 Scarlet Witch — a primate version of Scarlet Witch
 Shang-Chimp — a chimpanzee version of Shang-Chi
 Speedball — a chimpanzee version of Speedball
 Spider-Monkey — a spider monkey version of Spider-Man
 Thorangutan — an orangutan version of Thor
 Vision — a primate version of Vision
 Wasp — a primate version of Wasp
 Wonder Monk — a primate version of Wonder Man
 Beyonder — a chimpanzee version of Beyonder
 Black Wido-rangutan — an orangutan version of Black Widow
 Cleook — a primate version of Clea
 Dagger — a primate version of Dagger
 Daregorilla — a gorilla version of Daredevil
 Doctor Druid — a primate version of Doctor Druid
 Doctor Strange — a gorilla version of Doctor Strange
 Elektra — a primate version of Elektra
 Eternals — this reality's version of the Eternals
 Thena — a monkey version of Thena
 Fantastic Four — this reality's version of the Fantastic Four
 Mister Fantastic — a baboon version of Mister Fantastic
 Invisible Simian — this reality’s version of Invisible Woman; unlike the rest of this reality’s Fantastic Four, when she acquired her powers, it also caused her to resemble a human
 Simian Torch — a primate version of the Human Torch
 Thing — a gorilla version of the Thing
 Ghost Rider — a gorilla version of Ghost Rider
 Hulk — a gorilla version of Hulk
 Insimians — this reality's version of the Inhumans
 Black Bolt — a primate version of Black Bolt who is the King of the Insimians
 Medusa — a primate version of Medusa who is the Queen of the Insimians
 Gorgon — a primate version of Gorgon
 Karnak — a primate version of Karnak
 Triton — a primate version of Triton
 Iron Fist — a monkey version of Iron Fist
 MACH IV — a primate version of MACH IV
 Power Simian — a gorilla version of Luke Cage
 Punisher — a baboon version of Punisher
 Silver Simian — a gorilla version of Silver Surfer
 Wolfsbape — an ape version of Wolfsbane
 X-Apes — this reality's version of the X-Men
 Professor X — an ape version of Professor X
 Angel — a primate version of Angel
 Beast — a primate version of Beast
 Cannonball — a primate version of Cannonball
 Colossus — a gorilla version of Colossus
 Cyclops — a primate version of Cyclops
 Icemonk — a primate version of Iceman
 Marvel Chimp — a chimpanzee version of Jean Grey
 Nightcrawler — a primate version of Nightcrawler
 Rogue — a primate version of Rogue
 Shadowcat — a primate version of Shadowcat
 Warlock — a primate version of Warlock
 Wolverine — a primate version of Wolverine

Villains
 Baron Blood — in this reality, retains his appearance and posed as Captain America while sampling his blood
 Baron Heinrich Zemook — a primate version of Baron Heinrich Zemo
 Doctor Doom — a baboon version of Doctor Doom
 Doctor Ooktapus — an orangutan version of Doctor Octopus
 Enchantress — an orangutan version of Enchantress
 Invaders — this reality's version of the Invaders who were infected by Baron Blood and turned into vampires
 Winter Soldier — a primate version of the Winter Soldier
 Namor — a primate version of Namor
 Red Raven — a monkey version of Red Raven
 Toro — a primate version of Toro
 Lizard — this reality’s version of the Lizard
 L-ook-i — a primate version of Loki
 Master Brotherhood of Evil Apes — a group of primate villains. The name is a combination of the Masters of Evil and the Brotherhood of Mutants
 Absorbing Mandrill — a mandrill version of Absorbing Man
 Batrook — a primate version of Batroc the Leaper
 Shang Chi-Chi — a chimpanzee version of Shang-Chi
 Tigorilla — a gorilla version of Tiger Shark
 Titanape — an ape version of Titania
 Wrencher — a wrench-wielding gorilla version of Wrecker
 Mole Monk — a monkey version of Mole Man
 Ooktron — a robot monkey version of Ultron

Other characters
 Aunt May — a monkey version of Aunt May Parker
 Edwin Jarvis — a chimpanzee version of Edwin Jarvis; Iron Mandrill's butler
 F-ool-killer — a primate version of Foolkiller
 Uatu — a gorilla version of Uatu the Watcher
 Uncle Ben — a monkey version of Uncle Ben Parker

Sequel

A sequel to the above, which pits Earth 2149's Marvel Zombies against their alternate meta-simian equivalents, entitled Marvel Zombies: Evil Evolution has been released, as well as 4 other one-shot issues: Speedball, Amazing Spider-Monkey, Grunt Line, and Prime Eight.

Collected editions

In other media
The Marvel Apes incarnation of Spider-Man, known as the Spider-Monkey, will make his cinematic debut in the 2023 feature film Spider-Man: Across the Spider-Verse, depicted as a member of Miguel O'Hara's Spider-Forces.

See also
 JLApe: Gorilla Warfare!, a concept by DC Comics similar to Marvel Apes.
 Larval Universe, another alternate Marvel earth home to animal versions of superheroes.
 Gorillas in comics

References

External links
 Monkey Business: Karl Kesel on Marvel Apes, Comics Bulletin, April 20, 2008
 Review of Marvel Apes #1 , Comics Bulletin

2008 comics debuts
Animal superheroes
Comics set in New York City
Gorilla characters in comics
Marvel Comics animals
Marvel Comics dimensions